Kelso is an unincorporated community located about three miles northwest of Sandy in Clackamas County, Oregon, United States. It was named for the town of Kelso, Washington. The post office operated for ten years, from May 31, 1894 to May 26, 1904.

References

Unincorporated communities in Clackamas County, Oregon
1894 establishments in Oregon
Populated places established in 1894
Unincorporated communities in Oregon